Jon Ellis Meacham (born May 20, 1969) is an American writer, reviewer, historian and presidential biographer who is serving as the current Canon Historian of the Washington National Cathedral since November 7, 2021. A former executive editor and executive vice president at Random House, he is a contributing writer to The New York Times Book Review, a contributing editor to Time magazine, and a former editor-in-chief of Newsweek. He is the author of several books. He won the 2009 Pulitzer Prize for Biography or Autobiography for American Lion: Andrew Jackson in the White House. He holds the Carolyn T. and Robert M. Rogers Endowed Chair in American Presidency at Vanderbilt University.

Early life
Meacham was born in Chattanooga, Tennessee. His parents are Jere Ellis Meacham (1946–2008), a construction and labor-relations executive who was decorated for valor during the Vietnam War, and Linda (McBrayer) Brodie. His paternal grandparents, Ellis K. Meacham and Jean Austin Meacham, raised him after his parents' divorce. When he was a child, his grandfather had discussions each morning with a group of men about local and national politics. As a result, Meacham developed an interest in politics. He received an invitation to Ronald Reagan's 1981 inauguration in Washington, D.C., in response to a letter that he sent to the president-elect.

Meacham attended The McCallie School, where he developed an interest in the civil rights movement. He then went on to attend Sewanee: The University of the South where he graduated salutatorian and summa cum laude in 1991 with a Bachelor of Arts degree in English literature and was elected to Phi Beta Kappa.

Career

Journalist and editor
After college, he worked at The Chattanooga Times, until he moved to Washington, D.C., in 1993 and became co-editor of Washington Monthly. In 1995, he worked for Newsweek as the national affairs editor, and became managing editor in late-1998. In 2006, he became editor-in-chief of Newsweeks print and online formats.

A former executive editor and executive vice president at Random House, he is a contributing writer to The New York Times Book Review and The Washington Post, and a contributing editor to Time magazine.

Biographer and book author
He was the editor for Voices in Our Blood: America's Best on the Civil Rights Movement which was released in 2001. Spanning the period from 1941 to 1998, the book includes writings of noted civil-rights leaders, novelists, and journalists, like John Lewis, James Baldwin, William Faulkner, and David Halberstam. His book, Franklin and Winston, Partners of an Intimate Relationship about Franklin D. Roosevelt and Winston Churchill, was released in 2003.

Meacham has explored America's leaders in such works as Thomas Jefferson: The Art of Power as well as his biography of Andrew Jackson,  American Lion, which won the 2009 Pulitzer Prize for Biography or Autobiography. Jill Abramson writing in a book review in The New York Times states that Meacham's books are "well researched, drawing on new anecdotal material and up-to-date historiographical interpretations" and presents his "subjects as figures of heroic grandeur despite all-too-human shortcomings". In his biography of Jefferson, Meacham identifies qualities that would be helpful in the current political arena, "Jefferson repeatedly reached out to his enemies and showed ideological flexibility." Regarding the former president's stance on slavery, Meacham states, "Slavery was the rare subject where Jefferson's sense of realism kept him from marshaling his sense of hope in the service of the cause of reform."

Selected by the Bush family to be the official biographer for George H. W. Bush, Meacham's book, Destiny and Power: The American Odyssey of George Herbert Walker Bush, was published in 2015. He gave eulogies for both President Bush and Barbara Bush when they died in 2018.

Other appearances

Over the years Meacham has been a frequent guest on various talk shows such as Charlie Rose, The Daily Show with Jon Stewart, The Colbert Report, and Real Time with Bill Maher. From May 2010 to April 2011, Meacham was co-host with Alison Stewart of Need to Know on PBS. He is also a frequent guest on CBS This Morning, Face the Nation, MSNBC's Morning Joe, and The Late Show with Stephen Colbert.

In 2014 Meacham appeared in Ken Burns' documentary series The Roosevelts: An Intimate History on PBS. He also appeared in a cameo in the 2018 film The Front Runner.

Meacham taught history at his alma mater, the University of the South, in 2014. He was a visiting professor of political science at Vanderbilt University before being appointed to the Carolyn T. and Robert M. Rogers Chair in American Presidency. Meacham is also the co-chair of the Vanderbilt Project on Unity and American Democracy at Vanderbilt University.

Meacham was asked to speak at the 2020 Democratic National Convention on the Soul of America. He endorsed Joe Biden, saying, "history, which will surely be our judge, can also be our guide. From Seneca Falls to Selma to Stonewall, we're at our best when we build bridges, not walls". According to The New York Times, Meacham was part of the team writing some of Joe Biden's speeches for the 2020 United States presidential election, including Biden's acceptance speech.

In November 2022, Meacham helped Nancy Pelosi, the Speaker of the United States House of Representatives, write a speech announcing that she would not seek reelection to House Democratic leadership in the 118th United States Congress.

Awards and honors
2009: Pulitzer Prize for Biography or Autobiography for American Lion: Andrew Jackson in the White House. 
2013: Hubert H. Humphrey First Amendment Prize from the Anti-Defamation League
2013: Founder's Award from the Historical Society of Pennsylvania
2016: The Sandra Day O’Connor Institute's Spirit of Democracy Award.
2022: The Lincoln Forum's Richard Nelson Current Award of Achievement
Named a "Global Leader for Tomorrow" by the World Economic Forum
A fellow of the Society of American Historians
Member of the Council on Foreign Relations
A trustee of the Thomas Jefferson Foundation and the Andrew Jackson Foundation
Chairs the national advisory board of the John C. Danforth Center on Religion and Politics at Washington University. 
Distinguished visiting professor of history at The University of the South 
A visiting distinguished professor at Vanderbilt University

Meacham has also been awarded honorary doctorates from several universities:
2005: Doctor of Humane Letters, Berkeley Divinity School at Yale University 
2010: Dickinson College
2010: The University of the South D.Litt. 
2012: Loyola University New Orleans DHL 
2017: Wake Forest University, 
2017: Middlebury College D.Litt.
2017: The University of Tennessee DHL 
2018: The University of Massachusetts Lowell
2019: Millsaps College

Personal life
, Meacham resides in Belle Meade, Tennessee. He married Margaret Keith Smythe, called Keith, in 1996. At the time of their marriage, she was a teacher, having studied at University of Virginia and the University of Provence. She taught in Metz, France under a Fulbright Scholarship. They have three children.

Meacham is an Episcopalian, and was chosen as Canon Historian of Washington National Cathedral in 2021.

Bibliography
 
 
 
 
 
 
 
 
  With Timothy Naftali, Peter Baker, and Jeffrey A. Engel.
  With Tim McGraw.

Notes

References

External links

 
 
 Interview about Franklin and Winston: An Intimate Portrait of an Epic Friendship, Booknotes, February 15, 2004
 Meacham discusses Franklin & Winston: An Intimate Portrait of an Epic Friendship at the Pritzker Military Museum & Library
 

1969 births
Living people
American biographers
21st-century American historians
21st-century American male writers
American magazine editors
American male journalists 
MSNBC people
News editors
Newsweek people
People from Chattanooga, Tennessee
People from Belle Meade, Tennessee
Pulitzer Prize for Biography or Autobiography winners
Sewanee: The University of the South alumni
American male biographers
American male non-fiction writers
American Episcopalians